Grand Union is a prospective open access operator who are proposing to operate train services in the United Kingdom from England to Wales and Scotland. Grand Union is headed by Ian Yeowart, who founded previous open access operators Alliance Rail Holdings and Grand Central before selling both to Arriva.

Proposals

EnglandWales
Grand Union first proposal was to operate a two-hourly services between London Paddington and  calling at Reading, Bristol Parkway, Severn Tunnel Junction, Newport and Cardiff Parkway. In its April 2019 submission to the Office of Rail and Road (ORR), it proposed operating hourly services between London Paddington and Cardiff Central.

In July 2019, the application was withdrawn and replaced with an amended one. In February 2021 the application was rejected. In April 2021 an amended application was lodged.

Grand Union proposed to operate with LNER Class 91s and Rail Operations Group Class 93s hauling nine-car Mark 4s and a Driving Van Trailer.

In December 2022, the ORR approved Grand Union's plan for the new rail service from Paddington to Carmarthen, directing Network Rail to enter into a contract with the operator. A fleet of new bi-mode trains will be used. The project is being developed in partnership with European investment company Serena Industrial Partners and Spanish rail operator Renfe. The new service is scheduled to commence in December 2024. The service will call at Bristol Parkway, Severn Tunnel Junction, Newport, Cardiff Central, Gowerton and Llanelli.

EnglandScotland
In June 2021, Grand Union lodged an amended application proposing to use LNER Class 91s and Rail Operations Group Class 93s hauling nine-car Mark 4s and a Driving Van Trailer.

References

External links

British companies established in 2018
Open-access train operating companies
Proposed public transport in the United Kingdom
Renfe